Stimold-MIF Chișinău was a Moldovan football club based in Chișinău, Moldova. They played in the Moldovan National Division, the top division in Moldovan football.

External links
 Stimold MIF Chișinău at WeltFussballArchive

Football clubs in Moldova
Football clubs in Chișinău
Defunct football clubs in Moldova
Association football clubs established in 1996
Association football clubs disestablished in 1998
1996 establishments in Moldova
1998 disestablishments in Moldova